The Beeches is a historic mansion in Springfield, Tennessee, USA.

History
The mansion was completed in 1869. It was designed in the Italianate architectural style. It was built for John Woodard, who served in the Tennessee House of Representatives. He gifted the mansion to his son, Albert G. Woodard, in 1889. By 1938, the property was sold to J.W. Helm. By the 1980s, it belonged to Robert Brown, Jr.

It has been listed on the National Register of Historic Places since March 25, 1982.

The Home is currently occupied by Kerry Roberts, a member of the Tennessee Senate, and his family.

References

Houses on the National Register of Historic Places in Tennessee
Italianate architecture in Tennessee
Houses completed in 1869
Buildings and structures in Robertson County, Tennessee
National Register of Historic Places in Robertson County, Tennessee